Merrill may refer to:

Places in the United States
Merrill Field, Anchorage, Alaska
Merrill, Iowa
Merrill, Maine
Merrill, Michigan
Merrill, Mississippi, an unincorporated community near Lucedale in George County
Merrill, Oregon
Merrill, Wisconsin
Merrill (town), Wisconsin
Merrill Township, Michigan
Merrill Township, North Dakota
Merrill College at the University of California, Santa Cruz

People
 Merrill Moses (born 1977), Olympic water polo player
Merrill (surname)
Merrill Cook, Utah politician
Merrill Garbus, musician behind the experimental indie project Tune-yards
Merrill Ashley (born 1950), American ballet dancer and répétiteur

Other uses
Merrill (company), a division of Bank of America
Skidmore, Owings and Merrill, architectural firm
USS Merrill (DD-976)
Nine men's morris, a strategy board game also called Merrills
 Merrill (crater)
 Merrill, a companion character in Dragon Age II

See also
 Marill, a Pokémon